Brantford was a federal electoral district in Ontario, Canada, that was represented in the House of Commons of Canada from 1904 to 1925 and from 1949 to 1968.

The riding was first created in 1903 from parts of Brant South riding. It consisted initially of the city of Brantford, the township of Oakland, and the part of the township of Brantford south and west of the Grand River. The electoral district was abolished in 1924 when it was merged into Brantford City riding.

It was recreated in 1947 from parts of Brant and Brantford City ridings. The second incarnation consisted initially of the city of Brantford, the townships of Burford and Oakland and the part of the township of Brantford lying south and west of the left bank of Grand River, in the county of Brant. In 1952, it was redefined to include a part of the township of Brantford lying to the east of the city Brantford.

The electoral district was abolished in 1966 when it was merged into Brant riding.

Members of Parliament

This riding elected the following Members of Parliament:

Election results

1904–1921

|}

|}

|}

|}

|}

1949–1965

|}

|}

|}

|}

|}

|}

|}

See also 

 List of Canadian federal electoral districts
 Past Canadian electoral districts

External links 
Riding history from the Library of Parliament
Riding history from the Library of Parliament

Former federal electoral districts of Ontario